Aoife O'Rourke (born 2 July 1997) is an Irish amateur boxer. She won the gold medal in the middleweight division at the 2019 Women's European Amateur Boxing Championships.

References

External links
 
 
 

1997 births
Living people
Irish women boxers
Middleweight boxers
Sportspeople from County Roscommon
European Games competitors for Ireland
Boxers at the 2019 European Games
Boxers at the 2020 Summer Olympics
Olympic boxers of Ireland
21st-century Irish women